Get Your Fight On! is the second EP by the American crossover thrash band Suicidal Tendencies, which was released on March 9, 2018.

The EP, which preceded the band's then-upcoming thirteenth studio album Still Cyco Punk After All These Years by six months, is their first since 1998's Six the Hard Way, while its release marks a lineup of Suicidal Tendencies only the second in the band's history to record more than one record together. However, guitarist Jeff Pogan would leave the band shortly after its release.

In addition to four new songs (including a cover of the Stooges' "I Got a Right"), the EP contains re-recordings of "Nothing to Lose" and "Ain't Mess'n Around" – both taken from Cyco Miko's 1996 solo album Lost My Brain! (Once Again) – and four variations of "Get Your Fight On!", including the album version which can be found on World Gone Mad.

Track listing

Personnel
 Mike Muir – lead vocals
 Dean Pleasants – lead guitar
 Jeff Pogan – rhythm guitar
 Ra Díaz – bass
 Dave Lombardo – drums

References

2018 EPs
Suicidal Tendencies albums